Iosif Tolchanov was a Soviet actor. Honored Artist of the USSR (1962).

Biography 
Iosif was born on 11 May 1891 in Moscow. From 1911 to 1914 he studied at the University of Liège in France, after which he entered the Mamonov Studio in Moscow. In 1918 he became a member of the Vakhtangov studio. In 1920 he began teaching, he worked in an Uzbek theater studio, in the Yakutsk GITIS studio, in the Shchukin Theater School.

Selected filmography 
 1924 — Aelita
 1925 — The Tailor from Torzhok
 1939 — Lenin in 1918
 1953 — Attack from the Sea

References

External links 
 Иосиф Толчанов on kino-teatr.ru

Russian male film actors
20th-century Russian male actors
1891 births
1981 deaths